Sport plays a prominent role in Gibraltarian life. The Government of Gibraltar promotes sport within Gibraltar and supports many local sports associations financially. Gibraltar also competes in international sporting events, having competed in the Commonwealth Games since 1958, and in the biennial Island Games, which it hosted in 1995 and 2019.

Government's role
The Ministry for Sport, headed by the Minister for Culture, Heritage, Sport & Leisure, is responsible for sports policy matters and the provision of support to educational establishments and the governing bodies of sport in Gibraltar.

The Gibraltar Sports Advisory Council is set up to advise the Government of Gibraltar, through the Minister for Sport, on all matters relating to sport including:

 Capital expenditure priorities
 Allocation of grants to sporting societies
 Sports development
 International competitions
 Availability and use of sports facilities

Sport facilities

The Government recognises the benefits derived from the Gibraltarians' participation in sports and other recreational activities. Therefore, particular importance is given to the availability of facilities for the practice of these sports as well as making these available to anyone for booking allocations free of charge.

There are a large number of sport facilities in Gibraltar, of varying standards. These provide opportunities for locals and visitors alike to enjoy sport recreationally as well as professionally for the serious sport enthusiasts, where they can improve standards and have the opportunity to participate in local and international events.

The main sport facilities in Gibraltar are the multi-purpose Victoria Stadium and the Tercentenary Sports Centre. These include facilities such as artificial turf football pitches, water-based hockey fields, tennis and padel tennis courts, athletics fields, archery practice range, cricket fields, squash courts, golf practice range, climbing wall and multi-purpose sports halls for basketball, badminton, volleyball, netball, handball, five-a-side football, and martial arts among many others.

Sports
In 2007, there were eighteen sports associations in Gibraltar officially recognised by their respective international governing bodies. Others, such as the Gibraltar National Olympic Committee, have applied for international recognition which are currently being considered.

Football

The Gibraltar Football Association applied for full membership of UEFA, but their bid was turned down in 2007 in a contentious decision in defiance of a previous Court of Arbitration for Sport ruling that held that GFA should be granted membership. UEFA's rejection was due to Spain's intense lobbying and vow to boycott any event involving Gibraltar. They were eventually granted membership in 2013.

Cricket
Cricket enjoys massive popularity in Gibraltar as the weather is perfectly suited to cricket games. , Gibraltar's national cricket team had featured in the top flight of the European Cricket Championship on four occasions, with its best finish, sixth place (out of eight teams), coming at the inaugural 1996 European Cricket Championship in Denmark. Gibraltar won Division Two at the Championships in 2000 and 2002, at a time when there was no promotion and relegation between divisions.

Rugby union

Rugby is played in Gibraltar under the auspices of the (English) Rugby Football Union, by both local teams such as Gibraltar Barbarians Rugby Club, and armed forces.

Basketball
Basketball in Gibraltar is managed by the Gibraltar Amateur Basketball Association (GABBA). Sponsored by Grind House, Men and Ladies GABBA teams play the senior basketball league in the neighbour Spanish province of Cádiz. Grind House GABBA won the 2007/08 female championship GABBA is a member of FIBA since 1985, and the men's team plays biennially the FIBA European Championship for Small Countries.

Darts
Darts enjoys widespread popularity in Gibraltar with regular participation in a league organised by the Gibraltar Darts Association, which is a full member of the World Darts Federation and regularly participates in European & World Championships. The Professional Darts Corporation is a regular visitor to Gibraltar, holding an annual tournament as one of the Players Championships.

In May 2010 Gibraltar was host nation for the Darts Mediterranean Cup. Six countries competed in the event; Cyprus, France, Gibraltar, Italy, Malta and Turkey. Gibraltar won the tournament, taking its first ever gold medal.

Membership of international sports federations

Gibraltar has gained membership of the following federations:

See also

 Gibraltarian records in athletics
 Culture of Gibraltar
 Sport in the United Kingdom
 Gibraltar Open - annual snooker event
 Gibraltar Chess Festival

References

External links
 Government of Gibraltar website on sport.
 SportGibraltar.com